Xerophyta scabrida is a plant species in the genus Xerophyta found in Africa. It is a poikilochlorophyllous plant which is desiccation tolerant.

References

External links 

plants.jstor.org

Velloziaceae
Plants described in 1895